Overwaitea may refer to:

 Overwaitea Foods, a regional supermarket chain located in British Columbia, Canada
 Overwaitea Food Group, parent company of Overwaitea Foods